Rudasht District is in Lordegan County, Chaharmahal and Bakhtiari province, Iran. At the latest National Census in 2016, the district had 16,762 inhabitants living in 3,678 households.

References 

Lordegan County

Districts of Chaharmahal and Bakhtiari Province

Populated places in Chaharmahal and Bakhtiari Province

Populated places in Lordegan County

fa:بخش رودشت (لردگان)